Flat-Pack Philosophy is the eighth studio album by English pop punk band Buzzcocks. It was released on 7 March 2006 by record label Cooking Vinyl.

Release 
Flat-Pack Philosophy was released on 7 March 2006; it was promoted with a UK tour with support from the Adored. Between March and May 2006, the band played across Europe, which included appearances at the Bourge Festival and Festival of the Arts. Partway through this trek, drummer Phil Barker left the band and was replaced by Danny Farrant. In June 2006, they played a few US East Coast shows prior to joining that year's Warped Tour, and then headlining another month's worth of shows with support from the Adored, the Strays, and Easy Image.

In August 2006, "Sell You Everything" was released as a single, with a live version of "16" and a demo of "Every Day Every Night" as the B-sides. Three months later, the band held two special shows to celebrate their 30th anniversary. On 4 December 2006, "Reconciliation" was released as single, with "See Through You" and "Holding Me Down" as the B-sides. In April and May 2007, they played three Europeans shows, prior to a short South American tour; upon returning to the UK, they played one-off shows in Newcastle and in Spain as part of the Primavera Sound festival.

Track listing

Personnel 
Adapted from the album liner notes.

Buzzcocks
 Pete Shelley – guitar, vocals
 Steve Diggle – guitar, vocals
 Tony Barber – bass
 Philip Barker – drums
Technical
Tony Barber – producer, arrangements
Harvey Birrell – engineer
John A. Rivers – remixing, mastering
Buzzcocks – sleeve concept
Paul Terrence Madden – sleeve concept, photography, design
Julia Helen Robinson – additional montage photography

References

External links 

 

2006 albums
Buzzcocks albums
Cooking Vinyl albums